Harold Booth may refer to:

Politicians
Harold E. Booth (1911–1970), candidate in California's 4th State Assembly district
Harold Booth, candidate in Results of the South Australian state election, 1975 (House of Assembly)

Others
Harold Booth, who wrote on British Naturism
Harold Booth (footballer) (1886–1964), Australian rules footballer

See also
Harry Booth (disambiguation)